Dimuth Warapitiya (born 1 April 1992) is a Sri Lankan cricketer. He made his List A debut for Tincomalee District in the 2016–17 Districts One Day Tournament on 18 March 2017.

References

External links
 

1992 births
Living people
Sri Lankan cricketers
Tincomalee District cricketers
Saracens Sports Club cricketers
Sportspeople from Kandy